Buang Tekurok (also known as Sengkirap), commonly known as Kampong Buang Tekurok, is a village-level subdivision of Lumapas, a mukim (subdistrict) of Brunei-Muara District, Brunei. The postcode for Kampong Buang Tekurok is BJ2524.

Name 
Kampong Buang Tekurok comes from the Malay name which translates as 'Buang Tekurok Village'.

References 

Buang Tekurok